A prop-word is a word with little or no semantic content used where grammar dictates a certain sentence member, e.g.,  to provide a "support" on which to hang a modifier. The word most commonly considered as a prop-word in English is one (with the plural form ones).

Another term for this concept is "pro-noun" (here "pro" means "for", "instead of"), with a similar concept "pro-verb" "do" (as exemplified by "I will go to the party if you do").

English language

Function
The prop-word one takes the place of a countable noun in a noun phrase (or determiner phrase), normally in a context where it is clear which noun it is replacing. For example, in a context in which hats are being talked about, the red one means "the red hat", and the ones we bought means "the hats we bought". The prop-word thus functions somewhat similarly to a pronoun, except that a pronoun usually takes the place of a whole noun (determiner) phrase (for example, "the red hat" may be replaced by the pronoun it).

The prop-word can generally be used with any of the modifiers that can typically accompany nouns. These include articles and other determiners, attributive adjectives, prepositional phrases, relative clauses, and certain others (see Components of noun phrases). Some examples of its use are given below:
this one
a green one
that one over there
the ones in the box
the one that you like
those nice sweet ones from Peru which we usually buy

Other words with limited semantic content that may sometimes be classed as prop-words include person and thing. In English, certain combinations of determiner and prop-word have developed into indefinite pronouns: somebody, anyone, nothing, etc.

Origin of "one"
This relatively minor topic of English syntax was a matter of a rather significant and prolonged discussion about the origin of the phrase "a good one", which involved such experts as Eugen Einenkel, Karl Luick, Otto Jespersen, Matti Rissanen, among others,  until the consensus of the authorities was established by Bruce Mitchell  in his Old English Syntax. Tauno Mustanoja gives a detailed overview of the opinions on the subject.

In other languages
Most other languages lack a prop-word used equivalently to English one.  Instead, they may make more use of demonstrative pronouns (similar to this or that when used without a following noun or prop-word). Phrases like "the red one" may be translated simply as "the red", i.e. using a nominalized adjective, as in the German der Rote, or the Greek το κόκκινο.

Japanese is an example of a language with a prop-word; the particle の can be used as one. 赤いの (akai no) = "the red one".

See also
One (pronoun)

References

Further reading
 Otto Jespersen, A Modern English Grammar on Historical Principles, Routledge 2013 (orig. publ. 1954), p. 245ff. 
Frederick T. Wood,  "Some Observations on the Use of the Prop-Word ‘One’", ELT Journal, Volume VI, Issue 2, WINTER 1952, Pages 46–54, 

Parts of speech